The 1995–96 Japan Figure Skating Championships were the 64th edition of the event. They were held from January 12 to 14, 1996 in Yokohama. National Champions were crowned in the disciplines of men's singles, ladies' singles, and ice dancing. As well as crowning the national champions of Japan for the 1995–96 season, the results of this competition were used to help pick the teams for the 1996 World Championships.

Results

Men

Ladies

Ice dancing

Sources
 inter-wiki Japanese

Japan Figure Skating Championships
1996 in figure skating
1996 in Japanese sport